The Mitchell–Arnold House is a historic house located in Pawtucket, Rhode Island.

Description and history 
It is a picturesque -story wood-frame structure, built in 1871 and added to and modified in subsequent decades. It began as a flank-gable cottage, a form typical for the time, and was gradually extended with projecting sections, additions, and an elaborately decorated porch to create a fine example of Queen Anne architecture. The original house was built by James W. Mitchell, a clerk at a local lumber company; the additions were probably made by John H. Arnold, a real estate and insurance broker.

The house was listed on the National Register of Historic Places on November 18, 1983.

See also
National Register of Historic Places listings in Pawtucket, Rhode Island

References

Houses on the National Register of Historic Places in Rhode Island
Houses in Pawtucket, Rhode Island
National Register of Historic Places in Pawtucket, Rhode Island
Houses completed in 1871
Queen Anne architecture in Rhode Island